Kozlov may refer to:

Places

Czech Republic
Kozlov (Havlíčkův Brod District), a municipality and village in the Vysočina Region
Kozlov (Jihlava District), a municipality and village in the Vysočina Region
Kozlov (Olomouc District), a municipality and village in the Olomouc Region
Kozlov (Žďár nad Sázavou District), a municipality and village in the Vysočina Region
Kozlov, a village and part of Bochov in the Karlovy Vary Region
Kozlov, a village and part of Bystřice nad Pernštejnem in the Vysočina Region
Kozlov, a village and part of Česká Třebová in the Pardubice Region
Kozlov, a village and part of Mladějov in the Hradec Králové Region
Kozlov, a village and part of Střelské Hoštice in the South Bohemian Region

Russia
Kozlov, former name of Michurinsk

Ukraine
Kozlov, former name of Yevpatoria, Autonomous Republic of Crimea
Kozlov, former name of Kozliv, Ternopil Oblast

Romania
Cozlov,former name of (Kozlov)
Region: Brăila, Dobruja

People with the surname
Kozlov (masculine) or Kozlova (feminine) is a Russian surname. It derives from the sobriquet "" (kozyol – "goat").
Aleksandr Kozlov (footballer) (1993–2022), Russian footballer
Alexander Kozlov (born 1981), governor-general of Moscow, Russia
Aleksei Kozlov (footballer, born 1975) (born 1975), Russian footballer
Aleksei Kozlov (footballer, born 1999) (born 1999), Russian footballer
Alexei Kozlov (figure skater), Estonian figure-skater
Andrey Kozlov, Central banker and murder victim
Anna Kozlova (born 1972), American Olympic synchronized swimmer
Artem Kozlov (disambiguation), multiple people with this name
Daria Kozlova (disambiguation) multiple people with this name
Dmitri Anatolyevich Kozlov (born 1984), Russian footballer
Dmitri Ilyich Kozlov (1919–2009), Russian aerospace engineer
Dmitry Timofeyevich Kozlov (1896–1967), Soviet military commander in World War II
Elizabeth Kozlova (1892–1975), Russian ornithologist
Evgenij Kozlov, Russian artist
Frol Kozlov, Soviet statesman, Hero of Socialist Labor
Ivan Kozlov, Russian poet and translator
Kateryna Kozlova (born 1994), Ukrainian tennis player
Mariana Kozlova (born 1983), Ukrainian ice dancer
Nikolay Kozlov, Russian water polo player
Olga Kozlova (born 1986), Russian pianist
Olimpiada Kozlova (1906-1986), Soviet economist, founder of management education in Russia
Pyotr Kozlov, Russian explorer of Asia
Sergey Kozlov (footballer) (1960–2014), Russian footballer and coach
Sergey Kozlov (politician), the Prime Minister of the unrecognized Luhansk People's Republic
Serhiy Kozlov (born 1957), Ukrainian football coach
Stefan Kozlov, American tennis player
Tatiana Kozlova (born 1986), Russian orienteering and ski-orienteering athlete
Tatyana Kozlova (born 1983), Russian race walker
Valeria Kozlova (born 1988), Russian musician
Valery Vasilevich Kozlov (born 1950), Russian mathematician
Vasily Kozlov (sculptor), Soviet sculptor
Vasily Kozlov (politician) (1903–1967), Soviet politician
Vladimir Kozlov, ring name of Ukrainian professional wrestler Oleg Prudius
Vladimir Kozlov (director) (born 1956), Belarusian director, scriptwriter
Vladimir Kozlov (politician), Kazakh politician
Vyacheslav Kozlov, Russian ice hockey player
Viktor Kozlov, Russian ice hockey player

See also
Kozlovsky (surname)
Kozlovka (disambiguation)
Kozlovice (disambiguation)
Koslov, a surname
Kozel (surname)
Kozioł (surname)

Russian-language surnames